Alexander Leslie Henderson Skene MC (22 August 1882 – 29 October 1959) was a Scottish amateur footballer who played in the Football League for Fulham as a goalkeeper. He also played in the Scottish League for Queen's Park and Hibernian and in the Irish League for Glentoran. He won one cap for Scotland at international level.

Personal life 
Skene was the older brother of fellow footballer Clyde Skene. He was educated at George Watson's College, Edinburgh University, Queen's University and qualified as a psychiatrist. He went on to work at Lanark District Asylum. Skene served in the Royal Army Medical Corps during the First World War and rose to the rank of acting major. He was twice wounded at Gallipoli in 1915 and was awarded the Military Cross in 1918 for gallantry and distinguished service in the field. After the war, Skene held the positions of medical superintendent at Perth Criminal Mental Hospital and of senior assistant physician at Tooting Bec Hospital. He moved to the Isle of Man in 1922 and became medical superintendent of the Isle of Man Mental Hospital. Skene was a member of the British Medical Association for over 40 years and was president of the Isle of Man branch of the organisation in 1935 and 1936.

Career statistics

References

 Sources

External links 
 
 London Hearts profile (Scotland)
 London Hearts profile (Scottish League)

1882 births
Scottish footballers
Scottish Football League players
British Army personnel of World War I
Association football goalkeepers
Queen's Park F.C. players
Royal Army Medical Corps officers
Stenhousemuir F.C. players
Hibernian F.C. players
Fulham F.C. players
English Football League players
Glentoran F.C. players
1959 deaths
Recipients of the Military Cross
NIFL Premiership players
People educated at George Watson's College
Alumni of the University of Edinburgh
Alumni of Queen's University Belfast
Scotland international footballers
Scottish Football League representative players
Irish League representative players
People from Larbert
Scottish psychiatrists
Footballers from Falkirk (council area)